Alan Maley (7 January 1931 – 13 May 1995) was a British visual effects artist as well as a matte painter.

He won at the 44th Academy Awards in the category of Best Visual Effects for his work on Bedknobs and Broomsticks. His win was shared with Danny Lee and Eustace Lycett.

References

External links

Best Visual Effects Academy Award winners
Special effects people
1931 births
1995 deaths
People from Surrey